The name Carrie has been used for two tropical cyclones in the Atlantic Ocean.

 Hurricane Carrie (1957) – a long-lived Cape Verde-type system that peaked as a Category 4 major hurricane.
 Tropical Storm Carrie (1972) – affected the Northeastern United States and the Maritime provinces of Canada.

Atlantic hurricane set index articles